The Westover School, often referred to simply as "Westover," is an independent college-preparatory day and boarding school for girls. Located in Middlebury, Connecticut, United States, the school offers grades 9–12.

Early History

Mary Hillard and the founding of Westover 
Westover School was founded in 1909 by Mary Robbins Hillard “to provide young women with a liberal education in a community which would contribute to the development of their character, independence and sense of responsibility.” The Main Building and Campus was designed by Theodate Pope Riddle.

The daughter of a clergyman, Mary Robbins Hillard was educated at the Collegiate School for Young Ladies in Waterbury, Connecticut, and at Abbot Academy.  She taught at Miss Porter’s School for six years, where she met her lifelong friend, Theodate Pope Riddle.  She became Assistant Headmistress of the Collegiate School, and then Headmistress when it became St. Margaret’s.

Because of Miss Hillard’s growing feeling that St. Margaret’s was becoming increasingly hemmed in by the growth of Waterbury, she and her friend Theodate began to plan a new school, west and over the hills from St. Margaret’s.  The St. Margaret’s trustees subscribed to the project, and work was begun in 1908.  In place of an old apple orchard, a great square building surrounding an open quadrangle was built.  The first class of students, which included all of the former boarders at St. Margaret’s, arrived at the School in 1909.  A number of the leading families in the area maintained their interest in Westover through the years."The School Estate consists of homestead, meadow, and woodland. In the general character of the building the endeavor has been to combine appropriateness with beauty, so that the charm and dignity of the academic and domestic atmosphere shall be an unconscious but elevating influence endearing the place to all coming under its associations." - From Westover's first catalogue Miss Hillard created many of the ongoing Westover traditions:  The West and Over teams, the apple trees in the Quadrangle, the Germans, the Lantern as the School’s symbol, the Lantern Ceremony, Dorcas, and other elements which have been woven into the fabric of Westover life over the years.“Be quiet and let your spirit fill the buildings." - Theodate Pope Riddle to Mary Robbins Hillard

Notable alumni

 Edith Cummings
Miriam DeCosta-Willis
 Ginevra King (expelled)
 Margaret Bush Clement 
 Edith Gwynne Read
 Isabel Rockefeller
 Alice Tully

References

External links
 

Preparatory schools in Connecticut
Boarding schools in Connecticut
Private high schools in Connecticut
Girls' schools in Connecticut
Educational institutions established in 1909
Schools in New Haven County, Connecticut
Middlebury, Connecticut
1909 establishments in Connecticut